Paul James Cosgrove,  (born December 30, 1934), is a former Canadian jurist as well as a former politician.

Political career
A lawyer by profession, Cosgrove entered municipal politics and served as Mayor of the Toronto suburb of Scarborough, Ontario from 1973 until 1978.

Cosgrove entered federal politics running as the Liberal Party candidate in York—Scarborough in a 1978 by-election for a seat in the House of Commons of Canada. He was defeated in that run, as well as in the 1979 election.

In the 1980 election, however, Cosgrove was elected, and was appointed Minister of Public Works, Minister responsible for Canada Mortgage and Housing Corporation and Minister responsible for National Capital Commission in the Canadian Cabinet of Prime Minister Pierre Trudeau.

He was reassigned in a 1982 cabinet shuffle to the position of Minister of State for Finance. He was dropped from the Cabinet in August 1983 but remained an MP until the dissolution of parliament the next year.

Judicial career
Cosgrove retired from the House of Commons to accept an appointment by John Turner to the bench of the Ontario Superior Court on July 9, 1984, shortly after Parliament was dissolved for the 1984 election. Cosgrove's judicial circuit was in eastern Ontario with his court based in Brockville, Ontario.

In 1999, Judge Cosgrove stayed charges of murder against Julia Elliott after a 22-month trial. He ruled that the Crown attorney, police and a deputy attorney general had committed 150 constitutional violations, findings that were unanimously rejected by the Ontario Court of Appeal in the fall of 2003 with the Court ordering a new trial. Julia Elliott subsequently pleaded guilty to manslaughter.

As a result, the Attorney-General of Ontario, Michael Bryant filed a complaint against Cosgrove, calling him unfit to be a judge, and accusing him of sullying reputations and of having "vilified the state".  As a result of the complaint, Cosgrove was suspended pending a hearing into his conduct that was scheduled for December 2004. Cosgrove complained to the Canadian Judicial Council that the scheduled hearing was unconstitutional and damaging to judicial independence. His lawyer claimed that Bryant's action created a situation in which the Attorney-General could punish judges for making controversial decisions, since a complaint by an Attorney-General automatically would result in suspension pending a hearing. According to Cosgrove's lawyer:

It creates a 'chilling effect' that will undermine the ability of judges to adjudicate fearlessly cases, as justice requires. This chilling effect undermines and is wholly inconsistent with judicial independence.

According to The Globe and Mail newspaper, Cosgrove's affidavit warned that judges might become afraid to criticize or rule against the Crown if they thought a vindictive attorney-general could, in effect, end their careers simply by lodging a complaint. The consequences of this were argued to be so negative that the process effectively permitted an attorney-general to become "the judge in his own cause". .

Both the Canadian Superior Courts Judges Association and the Ontario Criminal Lawyers' Association supported Cosgrove's case.

In October, 2005, the trial division of the Federal Court of Canada ruled in favor of Judge Cosgrove and stripped the Attorney-General of the power to force the Canadian Judicial Council to conduct hearings that could remove judges from the bench.

The federal court ruling temporarily halted the proceedings against Judge Cosgrove who had been on a paid leave of absence since Bryant's April 2004 request for a disciplinary hearing.  On March 12, 2007, however, the appellate division of the Federal Court of Canada reversed the trial division, and found against Justice Cosgrove.  The Federal Court of Appeal set aside the decision of the Federal Court, dismissed the application for judicial review, and referred the matter back to the Inquiry Committee of the Canadian Judicial Council.

On December 4, 2008, in a 4-1 decision, a committee of the Canadian Judicial Council found grounds for recommending to the federal justice minister that Cosgrove be removed from office.

The full Canadian Judicial Council, made up of the 22 of Canada's chief justices and senior judges, met to consider the committee's recommendation and, on March 31, 2009 formally recommended to Parliament that Cosgrove be removed saying that "We find that Justice Cosgrove has failed in the execution of the duties of his judicial office and that public confidence in his ability to discharge those duties in the future has been irrevocably lost." The decision also stated that "We find that there is no alternative measure to removal that would be sufficient to restore public confidence in the judge in this case." This was the second time in the council's history that it has recommended the removal of a judge. The same recommendation was made in 1996 in regards to then Justice Jean Bienvenue who resigned rather than wait for Parliament to decide his fate.

On April 2, 2009, Cosgrove resigned from the bench. If he had not done so, and had also not taken the option of making an application to the Federal Court for a judicial review of the finding, the House of Commons and Senate would have had to vote on whether to remove him from office, something which has never happened since Canadian confederation.

References
Court trims provinces' power over judges: ruling favours Paul Cosgrove from the Ottawa Citizen October 28, 2005.

External links
 

Metropolitan Toronto councillors
1934 births
Living people
Members of the House of Commons of Canada from Ontario
Liberal Party of Canada MPs
Judges in Ontario
Lawyers in Ontario
Members of the King's Privy Council for Canada
Mayors of Scarborough, Toronto